Renuga Veeran (born 20 June 1986) is a Malaysian-born Australian badminton player. She has represented both Malaysia and Australia internationally as a badminton player.  As part of the Australian Olympic Team, she paired with Leanne Choo and reached the quarter-finals in the women's doubles competition at the 2012 Summer Olympics.

Personal
Veeran, nicknamed Nunu and Nuges, was born on 20 June 1986 in Kuala Lumpur, Malaysia. Her mother, father and brother (Raj Veeran) all played badminton, representing Malaysia in international competitions.

Veeran is an ethnic Tamilian, and speaks Tamil fluently. She gave an interview in Tamil language to the Australian Special Broadcasting Service (SBS) Tamil Radio a week after returning from the London Olympics. Veeran stated in the interview that she was warmly received by the Prime Minister of Australia on her return to Sydney from the games.

She is right handed.

Veeran attended primary school at Sekolah Rendah Kepong in Kuala Lumpur, Malaysia. She moved to Australia when she was sixteen years old. She attended Leichhardt High School in the Sydney suburbs for high school. She earned a Bachelor of Business in Applied Economics and International Trade from Victoria University, attending from 2007 to 2009.  , she lived in Melbourne, Victoria.

Badminton
Veeran started playing badminton when she was six years old. She represents Badminton Australia on the club level, and is coached by Ricky Yu, who became her coach in 2008. She trains in Melbourne. Her highest world ranking in the women's doubles was 26th in December 2011. Her highest mixed doubles world ranking was 40th. Her world doubles ranking as of January 2012 was 30th. She has held several Australasia region top female player rankings, including being first in the ladies singles, ladies doubles and mixed doubles to hold the top spots at the same time. The year she moved to Australia, she became the number one ranked badminton player in the country when she was sixteen years old.

Malaysian national team
Veeran represented Malaysia as a member of their junior national team on the World Juniors level.

Australian national team
, Veeran has been a member of the Australian national team for six years. As a member of the national team, she is based at the Melbourne Sports and Aquatic Centre. She has represented Australia as a member of the national team at several different competitions including the 2010 Uber Cup, the 2010 Commonwealth Games and the 2011 Sudirman Cup. Her women's doubles team which included London bound teammate Leanne Choo finished fifth at the Commonwealth Games. She also competed in the mixed doubles event and team event at the 2010 Commonwealth Games with her brother Raj, finished 17th in the individual event and fifth in the mixed team event.

Veeran finished 17th in the doubles competition at the 2012 Thomas & Uber Cup held in Wuhan, China. At the Thomas Cup, Veeran and Choo lost to South Koreans Kim Min-Jung and Ha Jung-Eun with set scores of 21–15 and 21–10. She finished 5th in the doubles competition at the 2012 Air Tahiti Nui International Challenge held in Punaauia, French Polynesia. She finished 17th in the doubles competition at the 2012 Yonex Australian Open Grand Prix Gold held in Sydney, Australia. She finished 1st in the doubles competition at the 2012 Oceania Championships, and also in the doubles competition at the 2012 Oceania Team Championships, both held in Ballarat, Australia. She finished 1st in the doubles competition at the 2012 Uber Cup Preliminaries – Oceania held in Ballarat, Australia. She finished 2nd in the doubles competition at the 2012 Thomas Cup Preliminaries – Oceania held in Ballarat, Australia.

Veeran was in Australia's badminton team for the 2012 Summer Olympics, making her Olympic debut as a 26-year-old. Going into the Olympics, as a doubles team, Veeran and Choo were ranked 35th in the world. During the qualifying process, their ranking peaked at 26th.

Achievements

Oceania Championships 
Women's doubles

BWF Grand Prix 
The BWF Grand Prix has two level such as Grand Prix and Grand Prix Gold. It is a series of badminton tournaments, sanctioned by Badminton World Federation (BWF) since 2007.

Women's doubles

 BWF Grand Prix Gold tournament
 BWF Grand Prix tournament

BWF International Challenge/Series
Women's singles

Women's doubles

Mixed doubles

 BWF International Challenge tournament
 BWF International Series tournament
 BWF Future Series tournament

References

External links
 
 
 

Australian female badminton players
1986 births
Living people
Australian people of Tamil descent
Australian sportspeople of Indian descent
Malaysian people of Tamil descent
Malaysian sportspeople of Indian descent
Sportspeople from Kuala Lumpur
Malaysian emigrants to Australia
People who lost Malaysian citizenship
Naturalised citizens of Australia
Badminton players at the 2012 Summer Olympics
Olympic badminton players of Australia
Badminton players at the 2018 Commonwealth Games
Badminton players at the 2014 Commonwealth Games
Badminton players at the 2010 Commonwealth Games
Commonwealth Games competitors for Australia